Mark Glowinski II (born May 3, 1992) is an American football guard for the New York Giants of the National Football League (NFL). He played college football at West Virginia. He also played football at Lackawanna College before attending West Virginia. He was drafted by the Seattle Seahawks in the fourth round of the 2015 NFL Draft.

Professional career

Seattle Seahawks
Glowinski was drafted by the Seattle Seahawks in the fourth round, 134th overall, of the 2015 NFL Draft.

In 2016, Glowinski earned the starting left guard spot, starting all 16 games for the Seahawks.

Glowinski entered the 2017 season as the Seahawks' starting right guard, starting the first two games before losing the starting job to Oday Aboushi. The other guard spot was taken by the veteran Luke Joeckel with the primary backup spot taken by rookie Ethan Pocic, moving Glowinski to fourth on the depth chart at guard. After an injury to Aboushi, followed by the emergence of the rookie Pocic as a starter opposite Joeckel, Glowinski was waived by the Seahawks on December 16, 2017.

Indianapolis Colts
On December 18, 2017, Glowinski was claimed off waivers by the Indianapolis Colts.

After beginning the season as a backup, Glowinski was named the starting right guard in Week 6 following a season-ending injury to Matt Slauson. He then started nine of the final 11 games.

On January 29, 2019, Glowinski signed a three-year, $18 million contract extension with the Colts through the 2021 season.

New York Giants
On March 17, 2022, Glowinski signed a three-year deal worth $20 million contract with the New York Giants.

References

External links
 West Virginia Mountaineers bio
 New York Giants bio

1992 births
Living people
American people of Polish descent
American football offensive guards
Indianapolis Colts players
Lackawanna Falcons football players
Players of American football from Pennsylvania
Seattle Seahawks players
Sportspeople from Wilkes-Barre, Pennsylvania
West Virginia Mountaineers football players
New York Giants players